The Argentine Association of Ice and In-Line Hockey is the Argentine national governing body for ice and roller in-line hockey, responsible for national men's and women's team, the selection of hockey inline, part of the IIHF World Championships.

Overview 

The Association was established in 1997 by a group of ice and roller hockey players with the purpose of developing both games in Argentina. One year later the organisation registered to the Secretary of Sports, and the International Olympic Committee recognised the AAHHL in 2004.

Men's and women's team have participated at the Pan American Ice Hockey Tournament. Despite this, ice hockey events are organized by a different institution: the Argentine Ice Hockey Federation (FAHH) organize a metropolitan and a youth league in Buenos Aires and the End-of-the-World Cup in Ushuaia.

The existence of two governing bodies is a difficult issue: while the AAHHL represents both national teams and it's recognized by the International Ice Hockey Federation, its players compete mostly on inline hockey; while FAHH players, who compete on ice hockey, can't be part of the national teams.

References

External links
 
 AAHHL at the IIHF 

Ice hockey in Argentina
Inline hockey in Argentina
International Ice Hockey Federation members
Ice and in-line hockey
Ice hockey governing bodies in South America